Ilta-Sanomat Player of the Year Award is an annual award given by the Finnish evening paper Ilta-Sanomat for the best individual players of Finnish top leagues in ice hockey (SM-liiga), basketball (Korisliiga), volleyball (Mestaruusliiga) and floorball (Salibandyliiga). Due to sponsorship reasons the award has not been given in football Veikkausliiga since 2009.

The award is based on post-match ratings made in every single match by a sport journalist and two local sportspersons or celebrities. Best player of the match is awarded with three points ("stars"), second best with two and third best with one. The player collecting most "stars" during the season wins the award.

Winners

Football

See also 
Finnish Footballer of the Year

Association football trophies and awards
Football in Finland
Finnish awards
Annual events in Finland